The 1989 Scheldeprijs was the 76th edition of the Scheldeprijs cycle race and was held on 19 April 1989. The race was won by Jean-Marie Wampers.

General classification

References

1989
1989 in road cycling
1989 in Belgian sport
April 1989 sports events in Europe